Odey is a surname. Notable people include:

Crispin Odey (born 1959), billionaire British hedge fund manager
Damon Odey (born 1971), New Zealand politician, mayor of Timaru
George Odey (1900–1985), British Conservative Party politician
John Odey (born 1959), Nigerian politician
Stephen Odey (born 1998), Nigerian footballer